Oleksandr Tugaryev (15 July 1995, Ternopil Oblast) — is a Ukrainian sailor, Master of sports of international class.

Sports results 
 Junior World Champion (2013) — 2nd place.
 European Champion (U-21, 2015) — 5th place.
 Multiple champion of Ukraine.
 First place in the National Regatta «Вітрильний Олімпійський тиждень», held in June 2016 near the town Vyshgorod.

Contest participants:
 Summer Olympics 2016 in Rio de Janeiro — class RS:X, results of 12 races took 23 place overall.

Remarks

Sources 
 Українська олімпійська збірна на Іграх в Ріо // НОК України.

External links 
 Ірина Ноженко. Тернопільський віндсерфер Олександр Тугарєв уперше в історії України ввійшов до Золотого флоту світу // 20 хвилин (Тернопіль). — 2009. — 22 вересня.
 Тернопільський віндсерфінгіст Олександр Тугарєв продовжує виступи на Олімпійській регаті // Управління фізичної культури та спорту ТОДА. — 2016. — 12 серпня.

1995 births
Living people
Ukrainian male sailors (sport)
Olympic sailors of Ukraine
Sailors at the 2016 Summer Olympics – RS:X
Ukrainian windsurfers